The 1994 Australian Open (also known as the 1994 Ford Australian Open for sponsorship purposes) was a tennis tournament played on outdoor hard courts at Flinders Park in Melbourne in Victoria in Australia. It was the 82nd edition of the Australian Open and was held from 17 to 30 January 1994.

Seniors

Men's singles

 Pete Sampras defeated  Todd Martin 7–6(7–4), 6–4, 6–4
 It was Sampras' 4th career Grand Slam title and his 1st Australian Open title.

Women's singles

 Steffi Graf defeated  Arantxa Sánchez Vicario 6–0, 6–2
 It was Graf's 15th career Grand Slam title and her 4th and last Australian Open title.

Men's doubles

 Jacco Eltingh /  Paul Haarhuis defeated  Byron Black /  Jonathan Stark 6–7(3–7), 6–3, 6–4, 6–3
 It was Eltingh's 1st career Grand Slam title and his 1st Australian Open title. It was Haarhuis' 1st career Grand Slam title and his 1st Australian Open title.

Women's doubles

 Gigi Fernández /  Natasha Zvereva defeated  Patty Fendick /  Meredith McGrath 6–3, 4–6, 6–4
 It was Fernández's 10th career Grand Slam title and her 2nd and last Australian Open title. It was Zvereva's 11th career Grand Slam title and her 3rd Australian Open title.

Mixed doubles

 Larisa Neiland /  Andrei Olhovskiy defeated  Helena Suková /   Todd Woodbridge 7–5, 6–7(0–7), 6–2
 It was Neiland's 4th career Grand Slam title and her 1st Australian Open title. It was Olhovskiy's 2nd and last career Grand Slam title and his only Australian Open title.

Juniors

Boys' singles
 Ben Ellwood defeated  Andrew Ilie 5–7, 6–3, 6–3

Girls' singles
 Trudi Musgrave defeated  Barbara Schett 4–6, 6–4, 6–2

Boys' doubles
 Ben Ellwood /  Mark Philippoussis defeated  Jamie Delgado /  Roman Kukal 4–6, 6–2, 6–1

Girls' doubles
 Corina Morariu /  Ludmila Varmužová defeated  Yvette Basting /  Alexandra Schneider 7–5, 2–6, 7–5

External links
 Australian Open official website

 
 

 
1994 in Australian tennis
January 1994 sports events in Australia
1994,Australian Open